The Association of Commonwealth Universities (ACU) was established in 1913, and has over 500 member institutions in over 50 countries across the Commonwealth. The ACU is the world's oldest international network of universities. Its mission is to promote and support excellence in higher education for the benefit of individuals and societies throughout the Commonwealth and beyond. It has a combined population of 3 billion, mainly under the age of 30, in Commonwealth countries.

Drawing on the collective experience and expertise, the ACU seeks to address issues in international higher education through a range of projects, networks, and events. The ACU administers scholarships, provides academic research and leadership on issues in the sector, and promotes inter-university cooperation and the sharing of good practice, helping universities serve their communities.

The Association of Commonwealth Universities is governed by its member institutions through an elected Council. As the ACU is a UK-registered charity, Council members also act as its Trustees. The ACU Council comprises up to 23 members: 20 elected Council members, up to two co-opted Council members and, if the Honorary Treasurer is co-opted rather than elected, the Honorary Treasurer.

History
In 1912, the University of London took the initiative to assemble 53 representatives of universities in London to hold a Congress of Universities of the Empire. They decided they needed a "bureau of information". Its affairs would be handled by a committee representing universities at home and abroad. In 1913 the office opened as the Universities Bureau of the British Empire. They incorporated under licence of the Board of Trade in 1919 and received a grant of £5000 to operate an office premises, with the understanding that the universities of the Empire would fund its maintenance. In 1948 the name was changed to Association of Universities of the British Commonwealth, and in 1963 it changed to its current name.

Dr Anastasios Christodoulou was the Secretary General of the Association of Commonwealth Universities from 1980 to 1996.

In 1986, Queen Elizabeth II became patron of the Association of Commonwealth Universities.

In 2019, Meghan, Duchess of Sussex became patron of the Association of Commonwealth Universities, a role which she held until February 2021.

Membership
Currently 40 countries from the Commonwealth are represented in the Association.

Criteria
Member universities are divided into full and associate categories, with the latter not holding voting rights. Full members must:
 Be legally incorporated and based in the Commonwealth, or have chosen to retain membership in the ACU when the country where they are based left the Commonwealth.
 Be authorised to provide higher education.
 Hold their own degree awarding powers.
 Have at least 250 full time equivalent students, of which over half are studying at degree level.
 Have graduated at least one cohort of students.
The criteria for associate membership are similar, except that the requirement to be able to award their own degrees is replaced by a requirement that their students may be awarded degrees of another institution under a franchise, license or other collaborative agreement, and that the institution whose degrees are being awarded is itself eligible for full membership of the ACU and is located in the Commonwealth.

List of Commonwealth Universities (ACU)

See also 
Agence universitaire de la Francophonie
British universities

References

External links
 

Commonwealth Family
International college and university associations and consortia
1913 establishments in the United Kingdom
Educational institutions established in 1913
Educational organisations based in London